Ketaki Sheth (born 1957) is an Indian photographer and author residing in Mumbai, India.

Personal life and education

Born and brought up in Mumbai in 1957, Ketaki gained her bachelor's degree in English literature from Elphinstone College. After a bachelor's degree in 1980, Ketaki got a scholarship from the Department of Communication Arts, Cornell University, Ithaca, where she completed her master's degree in communication arts.

Awards
1992: Sanskriti Award for Indian photography.

1993: The Sanskriti Award for Indian Photography in New Delhi.

2006: Higashikawa Award in Japan.

2008:  Solo Show (Bombay Mix)

Books
 A Certain Grace: The Sidi, Indians of African Descent, PHOTOINK (1 January 2013), 
 Bombay Mix: Street Photographs, Dewi Lewis Publishing (4 October 2007), 
 Twinspotting: Photographs of Patel Twins in Britain and India, Dewi Lewis Publishing (10 April 2000),

References

Living people
1957 births
People from Mumbai
Indian portrait photographers
Indian women photographers
21st-century Indian photographers
21st-century women photographers